Let's Try Again is a 1934 American melodrama film starring Clive Brook. It was known in Britain as Marriage Symphony.

It earned $183,000 at the box office at a time when a film of its budget was expected to earn $250,000.

Cast
Diana Wynyard as Alice Overton
Clive Brook as Dr. Jack Overton
Helen Vinson as Nan Blake
Irene Hervey as Marge Phelps
Theodore Newton as Paul Milburn
Arthur Hoyt as Phillips, the Butler
Henry Kolker as Mr. Blake

References

External links

1934 films
1934 drama films
American drama films
American black-and-white films
Melodrama films
1930s American films